Beckenham is an inner suburb of Christchurch, New Zealand, located three kilometres south of the city centre. The Ōpāwaho / Heathcote River winds through this predominantly residential suburb, a section of which is often referred to locally as the "Beckenham Loop". Beckenham is bounded by Sydenham to the north, Somerfield to the west, Cashmere and Huntsbury to the south and St Martins to the east.

History 
European settlement of Beckenham dates back to the first arrival of British settlers in Christchurch, and was part of the initial allocation of land to the new settlers. The Beckenham area, which was known as Middle Heathcote at the time, was divided into two plots of farmland - the first of which was purchased by brothers Stephen and James Fisher, with the other going to James' father-in-law. Stephen Fisher named the area Beckenham after the English town of the same name, although the name Fisherton was also used in honour of the brothers. The brothers and their family farmed the area until their deaths, at which point demand for residential land in Christchurch was growing. The farms were subdivided in 1906, forming the new suburbs of Beckenham and Fisherton in the process. The suburb grew in size as the Christchurch tramway system expanded into the area, down Colombo Street to Devon Street (1880), then Tennyson Street and finally to the Port Hills (1898), providing easy access from the suburb to the central city. During this process, the name Fisherton gradually fell into disuse, with the name Beckenham being applied to the whole area. Electricity was provided to Beckenham in 1912 and a waste water scheme was provided in the 1920s.

Amenities 

The Beckenham shopping area on Colombo St, had a number of buildings demolished as a result of the 2010-11 earthquakes, but overall the area continues to thrive, with a butcher, café, pharmacy and post shop, among other businesses. Several restaurants and Hettie's Rock Shop are popular with local residents. The Christchurch South Police Station is located on Colombo Street. 

Beckenham is home to the Beckenham  Methodist Church, Beckenham Baptist Church and St Peters Beckenham Catholic Church.
Beckenham Park has duck ponds, is the home to the Southern Districts Cricket Club and the Beckenham Tennis Club.  The Opawa-Saint Martins Toy Library is located in the former Beckenham Library on Sandwich Road.

Houses 
There are many original houses built in the 1900s-1950s consisting of single- and the occasional two-storey villas, some brick single-storey dwellings, wooden bungalows, and a few Art Deco houses. There are a number of larger houses on Fisher Avenue. Many houses throughout the suburb have well established front gardens. The streets are relatively wide, with many mature street trees, including London Plane trees. Some subdivision has occurred with new houses located behind the original houses with separate driveways and associated fencing. The trees on Fisher Avenue and Norwood Street contribute to Beckenham by creating a pleasant street appearance.

Flooding issues 

Beckenham's location on the banks of the Ōpāwaho / Heathcote River means that streets along the river are prone to flooding during heavy rain events, like many suburbs in the lower reaches of the Ōpāwaho. The Christchurch City Council continues to implement flood mitigation strategies to lessen the impact of this.

Demographics 

Beckenham had a population of 2,403 at the 2018 New Zealand census, a decrease of 39 people (-1.6%) since the 2013 census, and a decrease of 48 people (-2.0%) since the 2006 census. There were 897 households. There were 1,125 males and 1,275 females, giving a sex ratio of 0.88 males per female. The median age was 41.2 years (compared with 37.4 years nationally), with 492 people (20.5%) aged under 15 years, 396 (16.5%) aged 15 to 29, 1,149 (47.8%) aged 30 to 64, and 363 (15.1%) aged 65 or older.

Ethnicities were 93.4% European/Pākehā, 6.2% Māori, 0.9% Pacific peoples, 3.4% Asian, and 2.9% other ethnicities (totals add to more than 100% since people could identify with multiple ethnicities).

The proportion of people born overseas was 24.0%, compared with 27.1% nationally.

Although some people objected to giving their religion, 61.7% had no religion, 29.8% were Christian, 0.7% were Hindu, 0.2% were Muslim, 0.4% were Buddhist and 2.0% had other religions.

Of those at least 15 years old, 747 (39.1%) people had a bachelor or higher degree, and 198 (10.4%) people had no formal qualifications. The median income was $39,000, compared with $31,800 nationally. The employment status of those at least 15 was that 1,005 (52.6%) people were employed full-time, 342 (17.9%) were part-time, and 48 (2.5%) were unemployed.

Churches

Beckenham Baptist Church 
The Beckenham Baptist Church was built on Colombo Street at a cost of 3600 pounds and could seat 210 people. It was opened by the Governor General, Lord Bledisloe. In 1981 a mezzanine floor was added to the church. At the same time, the choir stalls and the pipe organ were removed. Damaged in the 2011 Christchurch Earthquakes, it was demolished soon after.

Beckenham Methodist Church 
Beckenham Methodist Church is located at 83 Malcolm Ave, Christchurch.

St Peter's Catholic Church 
St Peter's Catholic Church and St Peters school are located on Fisher Avenue. St Peter's school was opened in 1927 with the land for the school donated by the Fisher family. It was proposed in 2019, that St Peter's Catholic Church could be closed in a reshuffle and amalgamation of parishes in Christchurch.

Primary school 

Beckenham Te Kura o Pūroto is a state, co-educational, primary school catering for school Years 1 to 8. The school opened as Beckenham School on Monday 8 February 1915 with 149 pupils and a staff of four, following lobbying to the Canterbury Education Board by the Beckenham Burgesses’ Association, who argued that it was too dangerous for Beckenham children to cross Colombo St tramlines to attend Somerfield School. The school roll and its buildings grew rapidly so that by 1928 the school roll reached 562. The roll in recent years (2020) has ranged from around 430 at the beginning of the school year and rising to around 510 by the end of the year. The Canterbury Earthquake of 22 Feb 2011 destroyed the school pool. A fire in January 2013 destroyed the library and multipurpose rooms. Approximately 13% of the school's population is Māori and there is a strong support for school te reo Māori and Tikanga Māori programmes within the community. Children of other ethnic backgrounds include Cook Island Māori, Samoan, Tongan, Indian, Russian, Hungarian, Dutch, German, African, Korean, Japanese and Chinese. The school has an attached satellite class from Ferndale School for moderately intellectually disabled children. The first school committee adopted the red, yellow and black colours of the Belgian flag as the school colours as a  tribute to the bravery shown by that country in the 1914-1918 World War. Beckenham is currently a decile 8 school. Beckenham School changed its name to Beckenham Te Kura o Pūroto on 1st January 2018 after the Ministry of Education approved the new name that was gifted by Ngāi Tūāhuriri rūnanga. Literally translated as "The School of the Ponds", the name reflects the school's location near the ponds of Beckenham Park alongside the Ōpāwaho / Heathcote River.

South Library 
The South Library is located on Colombo Street by the Heathcote river. Designed by architects Warren and Mahoney and completed in 2003, The South Library provides 2400 square metres of space in a single story building. It was designed with numerous features that make it a particularly environmentally friendly building. In 2004, the library received a supreme award at the New Zealand Institute of Architects award ceremony. While it received temporary repairs following the 2011 earthquake, in 2022 it was decided to demolish and rebuild the library in 2024, at a projected cost of almost $25M.

External links
 Beckenham, Christchurch City Libraries

Notes 

Suburbs of Christchurch